The Rowing Federation of India (RFI) is the central body for the game of rowing in India. It was formed on August 30, 1976 with a view to make the sport of Rowing popular in India. It is affiliated with the Indian Olympic Association and Fédération Internationale des Sociétés d'Aviron and Asian Rowing Federation .

History
The British brought this game to this sub-continent of India and it was organised wherever suitable stretches of water were found near their settlements. The Calcutta Rowing Club, Calcutta was founded in 1858 followed by the Madras Boat Club, Madras in 1867, the Royal Connaught Boat Club, Pune in 1868, Karachi Boat Club, Karachi in 1923 and the Rangoon University Boat Club in 1923. Then ten active members from the Rowing Clubs of Calcutta and Madras, feeling a need for National and International status for the sport in India, formed the Rowing Federation of India on August 30, 1976. Since then the RFI has been popularizing the game nationwide and producing distinct players from the country.

Affiliates
Till date the RFI has 28 affiliated state and national bodies under it consisting of 19 Members, 6 Provisional Members and 3 Associate Members.

Members
Andaman & Nicobar Rowing Association
Assam Boat Racing & Rowing Association
Chandigarh Rowing Association
Delhi Rowing Association
Jharkhand Rowing Association
Karnataka Amateur Rowing Association
Kerala Race Boats & Amateur Rowing Association
Maharashtra Rowing Association
Manipur Rowing Association
Orissa Association For Rowing & Sculling
Punjab Amateur Rowing Association
Rowing Association of Haryana
Rowing Association of Madhya Pradesh
Sculling & Rowing Association of Andhra Pradesh
Tamil Nadu Amateur Rowing Association
Telangana Rowing Association
Uttar Pradesh Rowing Association
Uttarakhand Rowing Association
West Bengal Rowing Association

Provisional Members
Chhattisgarh Pradesh Rowing Association (Provisionally Affiliated)
Gujarat Rowing Association (Provisionally Affiliated)
Jammu & Kashmir Rowing Association (Provisionally Affiliated)
Rajasthan Rowing Association (Provisionally Affiliated)
Rowing Association of Bihar (Provisionally Affiliated)
Socie'te D'Aviron Pondicherry (Provisionally Affiliated)

Associate Members
All India Police Sports Control Board
All India Universities
Services Sports Control Board

References

External links
Official Website of RFI

India
Sports governing bodies in India
Sports organizations established in 1976
Rowing in India
1976 establishments in Tamil Nadu
Organisations based in Chennai